WBZD-FM (93.3 MHz) is a classic hits music formatted radio station licensed to Muncy, Pennsylvania, United States. The station is branded as "93.3 WBZD" and serves the Williamsport, Pennsylvania, area. It is owned by Van A. Michael, through licensee Backyard Broadcasting of Pennsylvania LLC.

93.3 WBZD on-air lineup:
 Mornings: Jake Michaels
 Mid-days: Keith Kitchen
 Afternoons: Kelly E.
 Evenings and overnights: board-oped

Previous Logo

External links

BZD-FM
Radio stations established in 1986
1986 establishments in Pennsylvania
Lycoming County, Pennsylvania